The Downfall of Ibliys: A Ghetto Opera is the full-length debut album by Manhattan, New York rapper MF Grimm, released on January 12, 2002 on his own independent label Day By Day Entertainment.

The album features a variety of producers: Cas, DJ Eli, dminor and DJ Rob A each produce one track, Dr. Butcher co-produces two with Metal Fingers and Count Bass D provides two solo productions and one co-production with Metal Fingers. The rest of the album's production, most of it, is handled by Metal Fingers. Vocal guest appearances are made by Count Bass D, MF DOOM and Grimm's Monsta Island Czars colleague Megalon.

All the tracks on the album are original, except for "Break 'Em Off," which appeared on the MF EP collaboration with MF DOOM.

Grimm was sentenced to life imprisonment in 2000 for narcotics and conspiracy offences. Paying a one-day bail of $100,000, he recorded The Downfall of Ibliys: A Ghetto Opera in those twenty-four hours. Grimm also said in an interview that the album is mainly a lot of questions he had about his life and that his other albums are answers to life. Studying law while incarcerated, Grimm appealed his sentences and filed counter-suits, with the ultimate effect that his sentence was commuted to three years and he was released in 2003.

The album is widely considered to be an underground classic alongside MF DOOM'S Operation: Doomsday and Count Bass D's Dwight Spitz.

The Downfall of Ibliys: A Ghetto Opera was, along with Digital Tears: E-mail from Purgatory, re-issued in 2010 after being out of print for many years.

Track listing

References

MF Grimm albums
2002 debut albums